Edward Stourton may refer to:

Edward Stourton, 6th Baron Stourton (1463–1535)
Edward Stourton, 10th Baron Stourton (c. 1555–1633)
Edward Stourton, 13th Baron Stourton (1665–1720) 
Edward Stourton, 27th Baron Mowbray (born 1953), British peer
Edward Stourton (journalist) (born 1957), BBC radio presenter